Billy Pollard is an Australian rugby union player who plays for the  in Super Rugby. His playing position is hooker. He was named in the Brumbies squad for the 2021 Super Rugby AU season and Super Rugby Trans-Tasman.

Reference list

External links

Australian rugby union players
Living people
Rugby union hookers
Year of birth missing (living people)
Date of birth missing (living people)
Place of birth missing (living people)
ACT Brumbies players
Australia international rugby union players